Killian Wiard Tillie (born 5 March 1998) is a French professional basketball player who is currently a free agent. He played college basketball for the Gonzaga Bulldogs. Tillie joined Gonzaga University beginning in the 2016–17 season.

Youth career
Tillie played basketball and volleyball until the age of 14, before choosing to focus on basketball. He started his basketball career in the youth setup at Cagnes Basket, when he was six years of age. He then moved to Stade Laurentin Basket, before joining the youth academy of Olympique d'Antibes in 2013. Prior to the 2014–15 season, he joined the INSEP academy.

Recruiting

In January 2015, Tillie was highlighted by ESPN among five of the best international players in the 2015 and 2016 classes with aspirations to play college basketball. He was drawing major interest from California at the time, and scouts were impressed with his  terrific offensive rebounding, athleticism and high motor.

In August 2015, Tillie traveled to the United States and took official visits to Georgia Tech, Utah, and Gonzaga. Less than a week after his trip to Spokane, he verbally to committed to play college basketball at Gonzaga University, citing the Zags' "success with international players and because of the people that love basketball there." He signed with the Zags in the early signing period in November 2015.

College career
He made his first appearance in a Gonzaga jersey on November 5, 2016, when scoring four points to go along with four rebounds, three assists, two blocked shots and two steals in twelve minutes of play against West Georgia. As a freshman during the 2016–17 season, Tillie appeared in 33 games, averaging 4.2 points and 3.2 rebounds in 12.3 minutes. He saw 14 minutes of action in the NCAA championship game against North Carolina, pulling down nine rebounds and scoring one point.

As a sophomore in 2017–18, Tillie was Gonzaga’s second leading scorer, averaging 12.9 points in 26.2 minutes per game to go along with 5.9 rebounds and 1 blocked shot per contest.

Coming into his junior season, Tillie was named to the Preseason All-WCC Team. On October 30, 2018, it was announced that Tillie was to miss approximately eight weeks with a stress fracture on his ankle.

Tillie missed the beginning of his senior season recovering from a knee injury. He returned to the lineup on November 19, 2019,  finishing with 15 points and eight rebounds as Gonzaga held off Texas-Arlington 72–66. On January 30, 2020, Tillie left a game against Santa Clara in the first half after suffering an ankle injury. At the conclusion of the regular season, Tillie was named to the First Team All-WCC. He averaged 13.6 points and 5.0 rebounds per game as a senior.

Professional career

Memphis Grizzlies (2020–2022)
After going undrafted in the 2020 NBA draft, he signed a two-way contract with the Memphis Grizzlies. On November 24, 2020, the Memphis Grizzlies officially announced the signing of Tillie.

On August 12, 2021, Tillie signed a second two-way contract with the Grizzlies. On January 1, 2022, he was signed to a two-year standard contract.

The Grizzlies waived Tillie on October 15, 2022, before the start of the 2022-23 season.

National team career
Tillie helped the French Under-16 National Team win the 2014 FIBA Europe Under-16 Championship, averaging 14.3 points, 9.6 rebounds, 1.7 assists, 1.2 blocked shots and 1.2 steals a contest, while being recognized as the tournament's MVP. He dropped in 25 points and grabbed 18 boards, in the title game, a 78–53 win over hosting Latvia.

In the summer of 2015, Tillie competed in the FIBA 3x3 Under-18 World Championships, where he teamed up with Bathiste Tchouaffe, Jules Rambaut, and Timothe Vergiat and he represented France at the 2015 World Championship, in Debrecen, Hungary, where they finished in third place, with an 8–1 record. His team defeated USA, featuring fellow Gonzaga commit Zach Collins, in the quarter-finals, before losing to Argentina in the semifinals, and thumping Spain in the third-place game.

He competed for France at the 2017 FIBA Under-19 World Cup, averaging team-bests of 12.4 points and 8.7 rebounds a contest.

Career statistics

NBA

|-
| style="text-align:left;"|
| style="text-align:left;"|Memphis
| 18 || 1 || 10.1 || .333 || .303 || .818 || 1.3 || .4 || .3 || .4 || 3.2
|-
| style="text-align:left;"|
| style="text-align:left;"|Memphis
| 36 || 3 || 12.8 || .339 || .314 || .625 || 1.7 || .6 || .6 || .4 || 3.3
|- class="sortbottom"
| style="text-align:center;" colspan="2"|Career
| 54 || 4 || 11.9 || .337 || .311 || .737 || 1.6 || .6 || .5 || .4 || 3.2

College

|-
| style="text-align:left;"| 2016–17
| style="text-align:left;"| Gonzaga
| 33 || 0 || 12.2 || .511 || .478 || .778 || 3.2 || .6 || .7 || .3 || 4.2
|-
| style="text-align:left;"| 2017–18
| style="text-align:left;"| Gonzaga
| 36 || 35 || 26.2 || .580 || .479 || .773 || 5.9 || 1.7 || .8 || 1.0 || 12.9
|-
| style="text-align:left;"| 2018–19
| style="text-align:left;"| Gonzaga
| 15 || 0 || 16.6 || .500 || .438 || .643 || 3.9 || 1.5 || .7 || .7 || 6.2
|-
| style="text-align:left;"| 2019–20
| style="text-align:left;"| Gonzaga
| 24 || 24 || 24.6 || .535 || .400 || .726 || 5.0 || 1.9 || 1.0 || .8 || 13.6
|- class="sortbottom"
| style="text-align:center;" colspan="2"| Career
| 108 || 59 || 20.3 || .548 || .444 || .750 || 4.6 || 1.4 || .8 || .7 || 9.5

Personal life
He is the son of Laurent Tillie, a former professional volleyball player and coach of the French national team, and Caroline Keulen-Tillie, a former professional volleyball player from the Netherlands. Killian’s brothers are also professional athletes: Kim Tillie plays basketball, Kevin Tillie plays volleyball.

References

External links

Gonzaga Bulldogs bio

1998 births
Living people
Basketball players from Paris
French expatriate basketball people in the United States
French men's basketball players
Gonzaga Bulldogs men's basketball players
Memphis Grizzlies players
Memphis Hustle players
National Basketball Association players from France
Power forwards (basketball)
Undrafted National Basketball Association players